Open Bogotá (officially named for sponsorship reasons Seguros Bolívar Open Bogotá, previously:Open Seguros Bolívar) was a tournament for professional tennis players played on outdoor clay courts and was held in Bogotá, Colombia from 2007 to 2017. From 2005–2013, it was an Association of Tennis Professionals (ATP) Challenger Tour men's event. The tournament was not held in 2014 but returned to the Challenger Tour in 2015. The event was also held as an ITF Women's Circuit tournament and from 2008 to 2011 the tournament had a $25,000 prize fund. A one-off $100,000+H women's tournament was also held in 2014.

Past finals

Women's singles

Women's doubles

Men's singles

Men's doubles

References

External links 
 Official website of Seguros Bolívar Tennis
 ITF search

 
ATP Challenger Tour
ITF Women's World Tennis Tour
Clay court tennis tournaments
Tennis tournaments in Colombia
Sport in Bogotá
Recurring sporting events established in 2005
Recurring sporting events disestablished in 2017
Defunct sports competitions in Colombia